Triberga is a village on the island of Öland in the kingdom of Sweden. For many years Triberga has been investigated for its unusual flora and fauna including littoral species.

See also
Hulterstad
Eketorp

References

Populated places in Kalmar County
Öland